Louis Cottrell may refer to one of two noted jazz musicians:

Louis Cottrell Sr. (1878–1927), drummer
Louis Cottrell Jr. (1911–1978), reedist